Piana is an Italian surname that may refer to
Carlo Piana (born 1968), Italian lawyer
Gina La Piana (born 1978), Latina actress and pop singer
Giovanni Piana (1940–2019), Italian philosopher
Giuseppe Ferdinando Piana (1864–1956), Italian painter
Joseph La Piana (born 1966), American artist
Marlin Piana (born 1982), Congolese footballer
Pier Luigi Loro Piana (born 1951), Italian billionaire businessman
Pietro Loro Piana (1883–1941), Italian businessman
Remo Piana (1908–1943), Italian basketball player
Rich Piana (1970–2017), American bodybuilder and businessman
Walter Loro-Piana, Italian racing driver

Italian-language surnames
Italian toponymic surnames